A by-elections in Senate District 59 was held in Poland on 6 March 2016. The election was required due to the President Andrzej Duda appointing incumbent Senator Bohdan Paszkowski as the Voivode of Podlasie.

The result was a victory for Anna Maria Anders of the Law and Justice party. Voter turnout was just 17.11%.

Background
The front-runner of these elections was the right-wing candidate Anna Maria Anders, who received the support of PiS. A few months earlier the PiS candidate Bohdan Paszkowski won nearly half of votes there. The centrist and leftist opposition united and supported Mieczysław Bagiński, who took the second place in this district a few months ago. He obtained the support of PSL, PO, Modern, and SLD. In elections he won over 40% (previously 27.44%) of votes, but it did not allow him to win a mandate, because Anna Maria Anders won 6% more votes.

Result

References

By-elections in Poland
2016 elections in Poland